Lapiwala is a small town in Bhakkar District in the Punjab province of Pakistan. Lapiwala is known for its orange production.

Populated places in Bhakkar District